The 1982 AFC Youth Championship was held from 18 to 22 December 1982 in Bangkok, Thailand.

Qualifying tournament

Qualified Teams
 
 
 
 

Final standings

Matches and Results

Winners

Qualified for the 1983 FIFA World Youth Championship

External links
RSSSF

References

Youth
1982
1982
1982 in Thai sport
1982 in youth association football
December 1982 sports events in Thailand